The 1939 Yale Bulldogs football team represented Yale University in the 1939 college football season.  The Bulldogs were led by sixth-year head coach Ducky Pond, played their home games at the Yale Bowl and finished the season with a 3–4–1 record.

Schedule

References

Yale
Yale Bulldogs football seasons
Yale Bulldogs football